St. Johns Technical High School is a public high school located in St. Augustine, Florida. "St. Johns Technical High School serves the district as a "School of Choice". "The school was created in 2004 and was designed to provide our district's at-risk students an academic program matched with technical training in a smaller, more personalized learning environment for the purpose of effecting a successful post-secondary career transition."

References

External links 
 

High schools in St. Johns County, Florida
Public high schools in Florida
2004 establishments in Florida
Educational institutions established in 2004